Oromocto High School (OHS) is a high school located in Oromocto, New Brunswick, Canada. It is the third largest school in the Anglophone West School District (ASD-W) which contains 70 institutions and around 23 000 students total. OHS is the source of education for about 1032 of those students, with between 1000 and 1100 annually. Oromocto High School is also the location for the Oromocto Education Centre which looks over different schools within ASD-W within Oromocto and the surrounding area. The principal is Kevin Inch, vice-principals are Maxine McConnell, Molly Nugent, and a third to be determined for the 2022-23 school year.

General information
OHS is currently the 6th largest school in the province of New Brunswick as of fall 2017 (when looking specifically at enrollment rates). Oromocto High School is located just off CFB (Canadian Forces Base) Gagetown. Oromocto High School has recently been recognized for their many wrestling achievements. OHS is also the only high school in the province of New Brunswick which offers all NBIAA (New Brunswick Interscholastic Athletic Association) Sports to students. It is also home to an AP Psychology class with one of the highest success rates in the country. The school also offers a variety of clubs and groups with some that meet during or after school ranging in many topics: mathematics, trivia, drama, student council, caring friends, robotics, etc.

The building
Oromocto High School was built using only wood in 1965 with additions added in 1976. The additions were mostly cement-based. The building has sixty-four classrooms, a double gym, seven computer labs, a physics lab, a chemistry lab, a greenhouse with flowers on the roof, and a 350-seat "Teaching Theatre" that was newly remodeled used for plays, lectures by guest speakers, and district drama festivals. There are also three biology labs, a media resource centre, an automotive technology laboratory, and a welding room. There are also three courtyards that are used for outdoor classes, BBQ's, or as a sitting area during lunch hour in the warmer months.

Notable alumni
 August Ames, adult entertainer
 Jody Carr, politician

See also
 Oromocto
 Anglophone West School District

References

External links
 Official School Website
 Anglophone School District West Website
 Oromocto High School Fan Page on Facebook

High schools in New Brunswick
Schools in Sunbury County, New Brunswick